Wado City (Orere Urhobo) is the proposed name of the urban, commercial and industrial Urhobo territories in Warri City in Delta State, Nigeria. It shares boundaries with Warri North and Warri South West.

On 23 August 2021 Dr. Ejiro Imuere made the proposal to establish Wado City on Facebook in order to reflect the identity of the Urhobo people in Warri South Local Government Area and to correct the error of subsuming neighbouring Urhobo towns by the name "Warri". Thereafter Wado City became a topic in several social media platforms (mostly Facebook) and blogs.

On 1 October 2021 the committee in charge of the actualization of Wado City held its first physical general meeting to mark Nigeria's Independence Day, where Dr Ejiro Imuere clarified the necessity for Wado City to actualize nonviolent ideology and to discuss the way forward to promoting a long lasting peaceful coexistence between Warri and Wado City and viable ways to attract investors to Wado City.

References

Cities in Delta State